Saira may refer to:

People 
Nikolas Saira (born 1999), Finnish footballer
Saira Banu (born 1944), Indian film actress
Saira Elizabeth Luiza Shah (1900–1960), Scottish writer who wrote under the pen name Morag Murray Abdullah
Saira Shah (born 1964), author, reporter and documentary filmmaker
Saira Khan (born 1970), runner-up on the first series of The Apprentice (Great Britain)
Saira Mohan (born 1978), Canadian fashion model of Indian, French and Irish descent
Saira Choudhry (born 1988), British actress
Saira Blair (born 1996), American politician
Saira Khan (actress), Pakistani actress
Saira Peter, First Pakistani Opera singer.
Saira Wasim (born 1975), Pakistani artist

Other 
Cololabis saira, the scientific name of the Pacific saury fish
Saira Batra, a character on the television series General Hospital: Night Shift
Saira (film), a 2005 Malayalam Language Indian film starring Navya Nair and Nedumudi Venu
Saira (video game), a computer game developed by Nifflas in 2009

Arabic feminine given names